This article shows the rosters of all participating teams at the men's basketball tournament at the 2011 Pan American Games in Guadalajara, Mexico. Rosters can have a maximum of 12 players.

Group A

Canada

The Canada men's national basketball team roster for the 2011 Pan American Games.

Mexico

The Mexico men's national basketball team roster for the 2011 Pan American Games.

Puerto Rico

The Puerto Rico men's national basketball team roster for the 2011 Pan American Games.

Argentina

The Argentina men's national basketball team roster for the 2011 Pan American Games.

Group B

Dominican Republic

The Dominican Republic men's national basketball team roster for the 2011 Pan American Games.

Brazil

The Brazil men's national basketball team roster for the 2011 Pan American Games.

Uruguay

The Uruguay men's national basketball team roster for the 2011 Pan American Games.

United States

The United States men's national basketball team roster for the 2011 Pan American Games.

References 

Team squads at the 2011 Pan American Games
Basketball squads at the Pan American Games
Basketball at the 2011 Pan American Games – Men's tournament